Laurens Huys (born 24 September 1998) is a Belgian cyclist, who currently rides for UCI WorldTeam .

Major results
2015
 7th La Philippe Gilbert Juniors
2016
 4th Overall Rhône Alpes-Valromey Tour
2017
 1st Stage 1 (TTT) Okolo Jižních Čech
2018
 10th Overall Okolo Jižních Čech
1st Stage 1 (TTT)
2019
 9th Internationale Wielertrofee Jong Maar Moedig
2020
 8th Overall Tour de Hongrie
2021
 5th Overall Alpes Isère Tour
 6th Overall Tour de Hongrie
2022
 7th Overall Tour of Norway

References

External links

1998 births
Living people
Belgian male cyclists
21st-century Belgian people